{| class="wikitable" style="margin:0.2em auto"
|+ Supreme Court of Puerto Rico
|-
! colspan=2 style="height:1em; background:#cfcfcf;" | Severo Quiñones Court
|-
| style="background:#ebebff" align="center" style="font-size: 90%;" colspan="2"| Chief Justice: José Severo Quiñones (1900–1909)

|-
! colspan=2 style="background:#cfcfcf;" | Hernández Santiago Court
|-
| style="background:#ebebff" align="center" style="font-size: 90%;" colspan="2"| Chief Justice: José Hernández Santiago (1909–1922)

|-
! colspan=2 style="background:#cfcfcf;" | del Toro Cuebas Court
|-
| style="background:#ebebff" align="center" style="font-size: 90%;" colspan="2"| Chief Justice: Emilio del Toro Cuebas (1922–1943)

|-
! colspan=2 style="background:#cfcfcf;" | Travieso Nieva Court
|-
| style="background:#ebebff" align="center" style="font-size: 90%;" colspan="2"| Chief Justice: Martín Travieso Nieva (1944–1948)

|-
! colspan=2 style="background:#cfcfcf;" | de Jesús Sánchez Court
|-
| style="background:#ebebff" align="center" style="font-size: 90%;" colspan="2"| Chief Justice: Angel de Jesús Sánchez (1948–1951)

|-
! colspan=2 style="background:#cfcfcf;" | Todd Borrás Court
|-
| style="background:#ebebff" align="center" style="font-size: 90%;" colspan="2"| Chief Justice: Roberto Todd Borrás (1951–1952)

|-
! colspan=2 style="background:#cfcfcf;" | Snyder Court
|-
| style="background:#ebebff" align="center" style="font-size: 90%;" colspan="2"| Chief Justice: A. Cecil Snyder (1953–1957)

|-
! colspan=2 style="background:#cfcfcf;" | Sifre Dávila Court
|-
| style="background:#ebebff" align="center" style="font-size: 90%;" colspan="2"| Chief Justice: Jaime Sifre Dávila (1957)

|-
! colspan=2 style="background:#cfcfcf;" | Negrón Fernández Court
|-
| style="background:#ebebff" align="center" style="font-size: 90%;" colspan="2"| Chief Justice: Luis Negrón Fernández (1957–1972)

|-
! colspan=2 style="background:#cfcfcf;" | Pérez Pimentel Court
|-
| style="background:#ebebff" align="center" style="font-size: 90%;" colspan="2"| Chief Justice: Pedro Pérez Pimentel (1973–1974)

|-
! colspan=2 style="background:#cfcfcf;" | Trías Monge Court
|-
| style="background:#ebebff" align="center" style="font-size: 90%;" colspan="2"| Chief Justice: José Trías Monge (1974–1985)

|-
! colspan=2 style="background:#cfcfcf;" | Pons Núñez Court
|-
| style="background:#ebebff" align="center" style="font-size: 90%;" colspan="2"| Chief Justice: Víctor Pons Núñez (1985–1992)

|-
! colspan=2 style="background:#cfcfcf;" | Andréu García Court
|-
| style="background:#ebebff" align="center" style="font-size: 90%;" colspan="2"| Chief Justice: José Andréu García (1992–2003)

|-
! colspan=2 style="background:#cfcfcf;" | Naveira Merly Court
|-
| style="background:#ebebff" align="center" style="font-size: 90%;" colspan="2"| Chief Justice: Miriam Naveira Merly (2003–2004)

|-
! colspan=2 style="background:#cfcfcf;" | Hernández Denton Court
|-
| style="background:#ebebff" align="center" style="font-size: 90%;" colspan="2"| Chief Justice: Federico Hernández Denton (2004–2014)

|-
! colspan=2 style="background:#cfcfcf;" | Fiol Matta Court
|-
| style="background:#ebebff" align="center" style="font-size: 90%;" colspan="2"| Chief Justice: Liana Fiol Matta (2014–2016)

|-
! colspan=2 style="background:#cfcfcf;" | Oronoz Rodríguez Court
|-
| style="background:#ebebff" align="center" style="font-size: 90%;" colspan="2"| Chief Justice: Maite Oronoz Rodríguez (2016–)

Judiciary of Puerto Rico
List
Puerto Rico